Acrotome angustifolia is a species of flowering plant in the family Lamiaceae. It is native to Zambia and South Africa.

References

Lamiaceae